is a Japanese professional baseball Outfielder for the Fukuoka SoftBank Hawks of Nippon Professional Baseball.

Professional career
On October 17, 2019, Satoh was drafted  by the Fukuoka Softbank Hawks first overall pick in the 2019 Nippon Professional Baseball draft.

In 2020 season, Satoh played in the Western League of NPB's minor leagues. On December 17, 2020, he was honored for the Western League Stolen base Leader Award at the NPB AWARDS 2020.

On April 29, 2021, Satoh debuted in the Pacific League against the Hokkaido Nippon-Ham Fighters. On May 15, he recorded his first stolen base against the Chiba Lotte Marines. He was named to the starting lineup for the first time against the Tohoku Rakuten Golden Eagles on June 26. In 2021 season, he made 25 appearances in the Pacific League.

April 21, 2022, Satoh got  his first hit against the  Orix Buffaloes. And on August 20 against the Hokkaido Nippon-Ham Fighters, he recorded his first home run. In 2022 season, he finished the season with a .125 batting average, one home run, and two RBI in 48 games.

References

External links

 Career statistics - NPB.jp
 30  Naoki Satoh PLAYERS2022 - Fukuoka SoftBank Hawks Official site

1998 births
Living people
Fukuoka SoftBank Hawks players
Japanese baseball players
Nippon Professional Baseball outfielders
Baseball people from Hyōgo Prefecture